Brunei Energy Hub Dermaga Diraja or Brunei Energy Hub in short, is the new name of the historic Royal Customs and Excise Building in Pusat Bandar, Brunei-Muara District, Brunei. The renovation project, which was entirely sponsored by Brunei Shell Petroleum (BSP), has been transformed into Brunei-Muara's very own interactive oil and gas museum. The museum, which is located alongside the Royal Wharf and has the Raja Isteri Pengiran Anak Hajah Saleha Bridge as a backdrop, seeks to act as a knowledge centre for the oil and gas sector and a venue to encourage the growth of Brunei's artistic scene.

History
The Royal Customs and Excise Building was built in the boxy Rafflesia design then fashionable in Southeast Asia and with a colonial flat roof in the late 1950s. A concrete structure with iron windows in the Victorian style replaced the temporary structures there. It was built by the same contractor, Sino-Malayan Engineer, and at the same time as the Sultan Omar Ali Saifuddien Mosque. The entire region was gated off in 1958, making it a secure enclave. The structure was converted into an art gallery in 2007 and included to the Waterfront and Dirgahayu 60 Monument Complex after it was gazetted in 2006 under the Antiquities and Treasure Trove Act.

The facility was turned over to the Public Works Department on 1 December 2019 as the project executor for building renovations to transform it into an interactive oil and gas museum. On 5 May 2021, it was officially announced that the building would become a new oil and gas exhibition hall. It would then served as the location for the official introduction of the Brunei Energy Hub Dermaga Diraja by Sultan Hassanal Bolkiah on 23 October 2022. The hub has seen more than 2800 visits since it opened roughly two weeks ago.

Exhibits
The Hab Tenaga Brunei Dermaga Diraja contains information regarding the oil and gas sector in Brunei. The museum has a canteen, a gift shop, an observation deck, and four exhibition halls. The fourth gallery is organized by the Museums Department of the Ministry of Culture, Youth, and Sports, whereas the first three galleries are organized by BSP. It includes:
 Our Past: Footsteps in Time (Masa Lalu Kita: Menjejaki Masa) – The first gallery presents the development of oil and gas in the country and the Bruneian way of life up until the first oil wells were explored in 1899, along with the effects this had on the economy of both the nation and the entire globe. Discover the origin of everything in the 180-degree projection room.
 Our Present: The Nation's Aspiration (Masa Kini Kita: Hasrat Negara) – The second gallery showcases the nation's current oil and gas business, including the industry's value chain and support infrastructure. You may learn more about the sector and how Brunei satisfies the world's oil and gas demands through interactive walls and stations.
 Our Future: Our Eyes on Tomorrow (Masa Hadapan Kita: Pandangan Masa Hadapan Kita) – The future of Brunei's oil and gas sector is highlighted in the third gallery. With the use of Augmented Reality (AR) tablets and entertaining interactive stations, learn how new technologies are changing the business world so that it is more sustainable and environmentally friendly. 
 Art Gallery (Galeri Seni) – The fourth gallery functions as a temporary art gallery for the local creative sector to display their works in an effort to assist the growth of the creative industry in Brunei. The audience will be able to see the creations of local artists through the presentation of sculptures, photos, paintings, and other framed and hanging works of art.

See also

 List of museums in Brunei

References

Museums in Brunei
2022 establishments in Brunei
Buildings and structures in Bandar Seri Begawan
Historic sites in Brunei